Several high schools use the name Technology High School:

Technology High School (Rohnert Park, California)
New Technology High School, Napa, California
Technology High School (New Jersey)
Technology High School (Omaha, Nebraska)
Information Technology High School (Pembroke, NC)
New Technology High School, Sacramento, California